The 1979–80 Penn Quakers men's basketball team represented the University of Pennsylvania as a member of the Ivy League during the 1979–80 NCAA Division I men's basketball season. Led by head coach Bob Weinhauer, the Quakers played their home games at The Palestra in Philadelphia. A year after reaching the Final Four, Penn again finished as Ivy League champions by defeating co-champion Princeton in a play-in game to receive an automatic bid to the NCAA tournament. Playing as the No. 12 seed in the Mideast region, the Quakers were beaten by No. 5 seed Washington State in the opening round.

Schedule

References 

Penn Quakers men's basketball seasons
1979–80 Ivy League men's basketball season
Penn
1979 in sports in Pennsylvania
1980 in sports in Pennsylvania